Manuel Pradillo (born 8 February 1975) is a Mexican modern pentathlete. He competed in the men's individual event at the 2004 Summer Olympics.

References

1975 births
Living people
Mexican male modern pentathletes
Olympic modern pentathletes of Mexico
Modern pentathletes at the 2004 Summer Olympics
Sportspeople from Mexico City